Ptosanthus is a genus of tephritid  or fruit flies in the family Tephritidae.

Species
Ptosanthus aida (Hering, 1937)
Ptosanthus helvus (Loew, 1861)

References

Tephritinae
Tephritidae genera
Diptera of Africa